Carabus hortensis is a species of beetle in the Oreocarabus subgenus which can be found throughout Europe but is rarer in the extreme southwest. It is common in the Middle East.

References

hortensis
Beetles of Europe
Beetles described in 1758
Taxa named by Carl Linnaeus